Joseph or Joe Watkins may refer to:

Joe Watkins (born 1979), English ice hockey goaltender
Joseph Ray Watkins (1840–1911), American entrepreneur
J. Louis Watkins Jr. (1929–1997), American judge
Joseph P. Watkins (born 1954), American media analyst
Joseph S. Watkins, namesake of Watkins, Ohio (established 1838)
Joe Watkins, fictional character in 2012 American film This Bitter Earth played by Billy Dee Williams
Joe Watkins (musician) (1900–1969), American jazz drummer
Joseph Watkins (active 1928–1931), American sailor in Star World Championships